The Punjab razorbelly minnow (Salmostoma punjabense) is a species of ray-finned fish in the genus Salmostoma.

References 

 

Salmostoma
Fish described in 1872